Rahugh  is a civil parish in County Westmeath, Ireland.

Rahugh is one of 8 civil parishes in the barony of Moycashel in the Province of Leinster.

Rahugh civil parish comprises 12 townlands: Ardan, Atticonor, Cappanrush, Garryduff, Kiltober, Lowertown, Monasset, Montrath, Pallasboy, Rahugh, Rossbeg and Sonnagh.

The neighbouring civil parishes are: Newtown to the north, Kilclonfert (County Offaly) to the east, Ballycommon (County Offaly) to the south and Durrow and Kilbeggan to the west.
The local GAA team for the residents of Rahugh is Tyrrellspass, a neighbouring village.

References

External links
Rahugh civil parish at the IreAtlas Townland Data Base
Rahugh civil parish at townlands.ie
Rahugh civil parish at The Placenames Database of Ireland

Civil parishes of County Westmeath